Yusuf Warsame Saeed (died 7 April 2013) was a Somali politician. He was the Mayor of Hargeisa, the capital of the Republic of Somaliland. An engineer by profession, Saeed was elected to the position on December 23, 2012. He served in this capacity until a few months prior to his death, which followed several months of hospitalization in Dubai.

References

2013 deaths
Ethnic Somali people
Mayors of Hargeisa
Somalian engineers
Year of birth missing